A drag-reducing aerospike is a device (see nose cone design) used to reduce the forebody pressure aerodynamic drag of blunt bodies at supersonic speeds. The aerospike creates a detached  shock ahead of the body. Between the shock and the forebody a zone of recirculating flow occurs which acts like a more streamlined forebody profile, reducing the drag.

Development 
This concept was used on the UGM-96 Trident I and is estimated to have increased the range by 550 km. The Trident aerospike consists of a flat circular plate mounted on an extensible boom which is deployed shortly after the missile breaks through the surface of the water after launch from the submarine. The use of the aerospike allowed a much blunter nose shape, providing increased internal volume for payload and propulsion without increasing the drag. This was required because the Trident I C-4 was fitted with a third propulsion stage to achieve the desired increase in range over the Poseidon C-3 missile it replaced. To fit within the existing submarine launch tubes the third-stage motor had to be mounted in the center of the post-boost vehicle with the reentry vehicles arranged around the motor.

At the same time (middle 1970s) an aerospike was developed in KB Mashinostroyeniya (KBM) for the 9M39 surface-to-air missile of 9K38 Igla MANPADS (in order to diminish heating of infrared homing seeker fairing and reduce wave drag), giving the name to the whole system ( means 'needle'). A simplified Igla-1 version with a different kind of target seeker featured a tripod instead of a 'needle' for the same purpose.

Further development of this concept has resulted in the "air-spike". This is formed by concentrated energy, either from an electric arc torch or a pulsed laser, projected forwards from the body, which produces a region of low density hot air ahead of the body. This has the advantage over a structural aerospike that the air density is lower than that behind a shock wave providing increased drag reduction.

In 1995 at the 33rd Aerospace Sciences Meeting, it was reported that tests were performed with an aerospike-protected missile dome to Mach 6, obtaining quantitative surface pressure and temperature-rise data on the feasibility of using aerospikes on hypersonic missiles.

Missiles with aerospikes 
 USSR
 9K38 Igla (MANPADS)
 US
 UGM-96 Trident I
 UGM-133 Trident II
 France
 M51 (missile)

References

External links
  American Institute of Aeronautics and Astronautics
  National Aeronautics and Space Administration
  Progress in Flight Physics

Drag (physics)
Aircraft components